Nile Warren Soik (May 2, 1923 – August 3, 2001) was an American politician, United States military officer, and educator.

Born in Milwaukee, Wisconsin, Soik graduated from Riverside University High School. He then graduated from the United States Military Academy in 1945 and served in the United States Army. Soik received his master's degree in business administration from University of Wisconsin–Madison in 1951 and his doctorate degree at Cornell University. Soik was a trainer in the human resource department at Allen-Bradley. He also taught at Milwaukee School of Engineering, Lakeland College, Marquette University, Milwaukee Area Technical College, and Cardinal Stritch University. He served in the Wisconsin State Assembly in 1961-1969 as a Republican and then in the Wisconsin State Senate in 1969–1973. He died in Whitefish Bay, Wisconsin.

Notes

External links
Memorials-United States Military Academy-Nile W. Soik-1945

|-

|-

1923 births
2001 deaths
Politicians from Milwaukee
Military personnel from Milwaukee
United States Military Academy alumni
Cornell University alumni
Wisconsin School of Business alumni
Marquette University faculty
Businesspeople from Milwaukee
Republican Party members of the Wisconsin State Assembly
Republican Party Wisconsin state senators
20th-century American politicians
20th-century American businesspeople